Daniel Brink Towner (March 5, 1850 – October 3, 1919) was an American composer who held a Doctorate of music, and used his abilities to develop the music to several Christian hymns which are still popular today.

Early life
Daniel B. Towner was born in Rome, Pennsylvania on March 5, 1850. He received his early musical training from his father, J. G. Towner. He later studied under John Howard, George Root and James Webb.

Musical direction
Towner was the music director at Centenary Methodist Church, in Binghamton, New York (1870-1882); York Street Methodist Episcopal Church, in Cincinnati, Ohio (1882-1884); Union Methodist Episcopal Church, in Covington, Kentucky (1884-1885); and Moody Bible Institute, in Chicago, Illinois (1893-1919).

Death

Daniel B. Towner died in Longwood, Missouri on October 3, 1919. He was buried at Rosehill Cemetery in Chicago.

Awards and works
The American Temperance University in Harriman, Tennessee, awarded Towner a Doctorate of Music in 1900. His musical works include:

References

External links

 Biography at the Cyber Hymnal
 
 
 

1850 births
1919 deaths
American Christian hymnwriters
American male composers
American composers
Burials at Rosehill Cemetery
Composers of Christian music